Fresia may refer to

 Fresia, Chile
 Fresia Island, a lake island in Los Lagos, Chile; see 
 Chilean submarine Fresia
 Mama Fresia, a Mapuche character in the Chilean novel Daughter of Fortune
 Fresia, a Mapuche supportive character in the Chilean-Brazilian animated movie Nahuel and the Magic Book
 Fresia (surname), Italian surname

See also 
 Freesia, a plant
 Friesia (disambiguation)
 Frisian (disambiguation)
 Freyja (disambiguation)